Mukhra Chann Warga is a 1969 Punjabi Pakistani film.

Cast
Naghma
Habib
Rani
Yousuf Khan
 M. Ismael
Munawar Zarif
 Shahida
 ChunChun
 Mazhar Shah
Sawan

Music
The music was composed by Ghulam Ahmed Chishti. Famous playback singers of the time like Noor Jehan, Runa Laila, Masood Rana, Mala, Naseem Begum  performed the songs.
 "Teri akh da nain jawab, bullian khirrian surkh Gulab, tohr jeeven wagda peya Chenab, te.." _ Masood Rana and Naseem Begum
 "Ban gaye phull gulab de ajj gorian banhwan..." - Noor Jehan
 "Satt Bismillah aayian noo, teinu wekhia te..." - Noor Jehan
 "Tera jehrri kurri te dil a, o main te nahin?" - Runa Laila

References

1969 films
Punjabi-language Pakistani films
1960s Punjabi-language films